Callen may refer to:

 Callen, Landes, France
 Callan, County Kilkenny, Ireland; also spelled Callen
 Callen Point, a promontory in the Maine, United States


People

Given name
 Cal Tjader (1925–1982), full name Callen Tjader, Latin jazz musician

Surname
 Bryan Callen (born 1967 American actor on MADtv
 Herbert Callen (1919–1993), American physicist and textbook author
 Ian Callen (born 1955), Australian cricketer
 Maude E. Callen (1898–1990), rural nurse and midwife in South Carolina
 Michael Callen (1955–1993), American musician and AIDS activist
 Sylvia Callen (fl. 1937–1960), Chicago communist from the 1930s

Characters
 G. Callen, the lead character on NCIS: Los Angeles

See also
 Callan (disambiguation)
 Kallen, a given name and surname